Sergei Soldatov (born 12 October 1970) is a former footballer and current football coach.

Career
He worked as a coach for FC Obolon Kyiv and FC Obolon-Brovar Kyiv academy known as Sports School Zmina Kyiv.

References

External links
 
 Soldatov profile at FC Obolon-Brovar Kyiv

1970 births
Living people
Sportspeople from Sochi
Russian footballers
Ukrainian footballers
FC Arsenal Tula players
FC Dynamo-3 Kyiv players
FC Slavutych players
FC Dnipro Kyiv players
FC Transimpeks Vyshneve players
FC Lada-Tolyatti players
Russian football managers
Ukrainian football managers
FC Obolon Kyiv managers
Association football midfielders
FC Zhemchuzhina Sochi players
FC Novokuznetsk players